Chobot may refer to:

Places
Chobot (Strakonice District), Czech Republic
Chobot, Lesser Poland Voivodeship, south Poland
Chobot, Łódź Voivodeship, central Poland
Chobot, Masovian Voivodeship, east-central Poland

People
 Emanuel Chobot (1881–1944), Polish politician
 Jessica Chobot (born 1977), American television personality
 Marián Chobot (born 1999), Slovak footballer

See also